Acrocercops tetradeta is a moth of the family Gracillariidae. It is known from Singapore and India (Karnataka and Maharashtra).

The larvae feed on Ixora coccinea. They probably mine the leaves of their host plant.

References

tetradeta
Moths of Asia
Moths of Singapore
Moths described in 1926